Jakob Hlasek and Yevgeny Kafelnikov were the defending champions but they competed with different partners that year, Hlasek with Guy Forget and Kafelnikov with Daniel Vacek.

Forget and Hlasek lost in the first round to Joost Winnink and Fernon Wibier, as did Kafelnikov and Vacek to Jiří Novák and Pavel Vízner.

Jim Grabb and Richey Reneberg won in the final 6–2, 6–1 against Neil Broad and Piet Norval.

Seeds

  Grant Connell /  Patrick Galbraith (semifinals)
  Guy Forget /  Jakob Hlasek (first round)
  Jonas Björkman /  Nicklas Kulti (quarterfinals)
  Yevgeny Kafelnikov /  Daniel Vacek (first round)

Draw

External links
 1996 Grand Prix de Tennis de Lyon Doubles Draw

1996 ATP Tour